Carnegie Free Library is a historic Carnegie library building located at Gaffney, Cherokee County, South Carolina. It was built in 1913–1914, and is a one-story over raised basement, rectangular red brick Classical Revival style building. It has a gently pitched standing seam metal roof and a brick parapet. In 1937, it was doubled in size by a rear addition. It is one of 14 public libraries built in South Carolina between 1903 and 1916 with funding from Andrew Carnegie and the Carnegie Foundation, and was Gaffney's first public library.

It was listed in the National Register of Historic Places in 2000. The building no longer contains a lending library. Today, the Cherokee County Public Library System operates a branch in Gaffney at 300 East Rutledge Avenue.

References

Carnegie libraries in South Carolina
Libraries on the National Register of Historic Places in South Carolina
Neoclassical architecture in South Carolina
Library buildings completed in 1914
Buildings and structures in Cherokee County, South Carolina
National Register of Historic Places in Cherokee County, South Carolina
Gaffney, South Carolina
1914 establishments in South Carolina